Plompton (formerly also spelt Plumpton) is a hamlet and civil parish south of Harrogate in North Yorkshire, England. It is close to the A661.

Plompton Hall is a Grade II* listed building designed by the architect John Carr and built about 1760.  The composer John Hebden originates from the parish.

History 
Plompton was mentioned in Domesday Book (as Plontone) and in the Middle Ages was variously spelt Plumton, Plumpton or Plompton.  The name is from the Old English plūme and tūn, and means ‘plum-tree farmstead’.  Plompton or Plumpton was historically a township in the parish of Spofforth in the West Riding of Yorkshire and became a separate civil parish in 1866.  It was the seat of the Plumpton family from the reign of William the Conqueror until 1749, when it was sold to Daniel Lascelles.  The estate was then part of the Harewood estate until the 1950s.  It was reacquired by the Plumpton family in the 20th century.

Plumpton Rocks

Plumpton Rocks is a man-made lake and surrounding pleasure gardens in the grounds of Plompton Hall.  The gardens were  designed by Daniel Lascelles

References

External links

 Plompton was in this parish
Plumpton Rocks website

Villages in North Yorkshire
Civil parishes in North Yorkshire